is a Japanese actor and the eldest son of the 56th Japanese Prime Minister, Junichirō Koizumi, and Kayoko Miyamoto.

He studied economics at night classes of Nihon University, but dropped out.

Filmography

Television
Who Wants to Be a Millionaire? - won the maximum ten million yen on a celebrity special

TV dramas
Nurseman (2002)
Hatsu Taiken (2002)
Shiawase No Shippo (2002)
Kurutta Kajitsu 2002 (2002)
Home & Away (2002)
Boku dake no Madonna (2003)
Korogashi Ogin (2003)
Igi Ari, Onna Bengoshi Oka Norie (2004)
Division 1 \"Pink Hip Girl\" (Fuji TV, 2004)
Yoshitsune (2005) – Taira no Sukemori
Slow Dance (2005)
Tokyo Wonder Tours (2005)
Gachi Baka (2006)
Attention Please (2006)
Fushin no Toki (2006)
Haken no Hinkaku (2007)
Attention Please SP (2007)
Hanayome to Papa (2007)
Otoko no Kosodate (2007)
Gokusen 3 (2008)
Yae's Sakura (2013) – Tokugawa Yoshinobu
Age Harassment (2015)
Akira and Akira (2017)
The Good Wife (2019)
The 13 Lords of the Shogun (2022) – Taira no Munemori

Films
 Bayside Shakedown 2 (2003) – Shigeru Koike
 Koshonin Mashita Masayoshi (2005) – Shigeru Koike
 Kamen Rider Hibiki & The Seven Fighting Demons (2005) – Takeshi
 Udon (2006) – Udon shop customers
 Bayside Shakedown 3 (2010) – Shigeru Koike
 Whistleblower (2019) – Shōhei Nagura
 You're Not Normal, Either (2021) – Miyamoto
 The Hound of the Baskervilles: Sherlock the Movie (2022) – Haruto Sutei
 Oshorin (TBA)

Ancestry

References

External links
 Official agency profile 
 JDORama Site 

1978 births
Living people
People from Yokosuka, Kanagawa
Nihon University alumni
Kotaro
Children of prime ministers of Japan
Japanese male actors